Přepychy is name of several locations in the Czech Republic:

 Přepychy (Pardubice District), a village in the Pardubice Region
 Přepychy (Rychnov nad Kněžnou District), a village in the Hradec Králové Region